Castle Hall (also known as Golden Bottom) is a historic home, formerly part of a larger farm of the same name. The home itself is on a 5.739 acre parcel that was subdivided from the farm in the late 20th century. The surrounding farm, still used for agricultural purposes, is located in Goldsboro, Caroline County, Maryland, and covers 676 acres. The main structure is a three-part "telescope" house, so called because it was built in stages, with each successive addition being smaller than the previous one.  The original -story portion is the largest of the three parts and stands at the northeast end. The smallest of the three parts is constructed of both wood framing and brick, unlike the rest of the structure which is almost entirely brick. It was built by Thomas Hardcastle in 1781.

It was listed on the National Register of Historic Places in 1975.

References

External links
, including undated photo, at Maryland Historical Trust

Houses in Caroline County, Maryland
Houses on the National Register of Historic Places in Maryland
Houses completed in 1781
Colonial Revival architecture in Maryland
National Register of Historic Places in Caroline County, Maryland
1781 establishments in Maryland